BBC Radio Cornwall is the BBC's local radio station serving the county of Cornwall.

It broadcasts on FM, DAB, digital TV and via BBC Sounds from studios at Phoenix Wharf in Truro.

According to RAJAR, the station has a weekly audience of 116,000 listeners and a 16.6% share as of December 2022.

Overview
Prior to its launch on 17 January 1983,local radio services for Cornwall had amounted to a regional weekday breakfast show Morning Sou'West on the frequencies of Radio 4 in Devon and Cornwall plus brief regional bulletins at lunchtime and teatime.

Initially, Radio Cornwall shared an afternoon programme with BBC Radio Devon, but now sustains up to 16 hours a day of local programming.

BBC Radio Cornwall can be heard on 95.2 MHz in the east, 96.0 MHz on the Isles of Scilly and 103.9 MHz in the west, as well as on DAB. It also broadcast on 630 kHz and 657 kHz AM until 2 March 2020, when those transmitters were closed for cost savings.

In addition, BBC Radio Cornwall also broadcasts on Freeview TV channel 721 in the BBC South West region and streams online via BBC Sounds.

Programming

During the station's downtime, BBC Radio Cornwall simulcasts overnight programming from BBC Radio 5 Live and BBC Radio London.

Cornish language output
Radio Cornwall is one of two radio stations to have broadcast programmes in the Cornish language. A five-minute news show, An Nowodhow, used to be broadcast every Sunday.

When Radio Cornwall was first set up Cornish language content was limited to around 2 minutes per week. In 1987, a new weekly 15-minute-long bilingual show, Kroeder Kroghan, detailing Celtic cultural events taking place in Cornwall, was introduced.

Notable past presenters 
Brenda Wootton (deceased)
Jonathan Samuels
Caroline Righton
Rod Lyon (deceased)
Laurence Reed

See also

List of topics related to Cornwall
Pirate FM
Heart West
Radyo an Gernewegva
Cornish media
List of Celtic-language media
NOW Cornwall Multiplex

References

External links 
 BBC Radio Cornwall
 Media UK - BBC Radio Cornwall

Cornwall
Companies based in Cornwall
Radio stations in Cornwall
1983 establishments in the United Kingdom